Pasparta (Paspartı) is a rural locality (a selo) in Ulagansky District, the Altai Republic, Russia. The population was 276 as of 2016. There are 2 streets.

Geography 
Pasparta is located 34 km north of Ulagan (the district's administrative centre) by road. Balyktuyul is the nearest rural locality.

References 

Rural localities in Ulagansky District